The 2019 Charleston Battery season is the club's 27th year of existence, their 16th season in the second tier of the United States Soccer Pyramid. It is their ninth season in the United Soccer League Championship as part of the Eastern Conference.

Current roster

Competitions

Exhibitions
Preseason schedule released on January 31.

USL Championship

Standings

Results by round

Regular season 
On December 19, 2018, the USL announced their 2019 season schedule.

All times are in Eastern Time Zone.

USL Cup Playoffs

U.S. Open Cup

As a member of the USL Championship, the Battery will enter the tournament in the Second Round, to be played May 14–15, 2019

References

Charleston Battery seasons
Charleston Battery
Charleston Battery
Charleston Battery